This is a list of administrators and governors of Jigawa State.
Jigawa State was formed in 1991-08-27 when it was split from Kano State.

See also
States of Nigeria
List of state governors of Nigeria

References

Jigawa

Governors